Pure Soul is the fifth released album from the Japanese rock band Glay. The album was a slight departure from the rock and power ballad sound the band sported with their previous albums. Pure Soul brought forth a faster alt-rock sound. The album contains such hits as "Yuuwaku", "Soul Love", the concert classic "I'm in Love", and the title track "Pure Soul". The album peaked at #1 on Oricon charts and sold about 2,430,000. It was certified "Triple million" by the Recording Industry Association of Japan (RIAJ).

Track listing
You May Dream - 5:15
 - 4:33
May Fair - 4:58
Soul Love - 4:30
 - 3:56
Pure Soul - 6:24
 - 4:16
Come On!! - 3:23
FriedChicken & Beer - 4:37
 - 7:33
I'm in Love - 6:28

All music and lyrics by Takuro, except for #2 (music by Jiro), all arrangements by Glay and Masahide Sakuma. Luna Sea guitarist Sugizo appears on #7 as a guest.

Covers
"Yuuwaku" was covered by Hero on the compilation Crush! 2 -90's V-Rock Best Hit Cover Songs-, which was released on November 23, 2011 and features current visual kei bands covering songs from bands that were important to the 1990s visual kei movement. It was also covered by Fantôme Iris, a fictional visual kei band from multimedia franchise Argonavis from BanG Dream! on the franchise first omnibus mini album Gin no Yuri/Banzai Rizing!!!/Hikari no Akuma released on December 9, 2020.

Album chart information
Oricon Top Ranking: #1
Weeks on: 41
Overall Glay Ranking: #3
(NOTE: Overall Glay Ranking is how it is ranked against Glay's other albums according to the Oricon)

References

External links 
 Oricon - Glay's profile on the Oricon
 Happy Swing Space Site - Official Site

1998 albums
Glay albums